Leptynia montana is a species of stick insect which is endemic to Spain. In 1998 the species was studied by Anna Paola Bianchi and Patrizia Meliado who discovered that the species have 40 chromosomes.

References

Insects described in 1996
Endemic fauna of Spain
Phasmatodea